Savannah is a city in and the county seat of Hardin County, Tennessee, United States. The population was 7,213 at the 2020 census. Savannah is located along the east side of the Tennessee River.

Savannah hosted the NAIA college football national championship game from 1996 to 2007, and is home to several places of historical significance, including the Cherry Family Mansion.

History
The city's original name was "Rudd's Ferry", named for James Rudd, an early settler who established a ferry at the site in the early 1820s. Rudd's Ferry was later purchased by a wealthy landowner, David Robinson. The city was renamed "Savannah" after Savannah, Georgia, the hometown of Rudd's wife, Elizabeth.

Battle of Shiloh

Hardin County was the site of the 1862 Battle of Shiloh (also known as the "Battle of Pittsburg Landing") during the Civil War. Union General Ulysses S. Grant commandeered the Cherry Mansion just off the city square for use as a headquarters during the battle.

Pickwick Landing State Park 
Originally a steamboat stop, the Tennessee Valley Authority bought the site in the 1930s during the Great Depression and constructed a dam and Pickwick Lake so electricity could be generated. In 1969, Tennessee bought  from the TVA and made it a state park.

Geography
Savannah is located just west of the center of Hardin County at  (35.223674, -88.237011), on the east bank of the Tennessee River. U.S. Route 64 passes through the center of town on Bridge Avenue, Main Street, and Wayne Road. US 64 leads east  to Waynesboro and west  to Selmer. Tennessee State Route 69 leads southeast  to the Alabama border.

Climate

Demographics

2020 census

As of the 2020 United States census, there were 7,213 people, 2,658 households, and 1,622 families residing in the city.

2000 census
As of the census of 2000, there were 6,917 people, 2,915 households, and 1,862 families residing in the city. The population density was 1,207.5 people per square mile (466.1/km2). There were 3,206 housing units at an average density of 559.7 per square mile (216.0/km2). The racial makeup of the city was 89.79% White, 8.56% African American, 0.22% Native American, 0.29% Asian, 0.01% Pacific Islander, 0.35% from other races, and 0.78% from two or more races. Hispanic or Latino of any race were 1.13% of the population.

There were 2,915 households, out of which 27.9% had children under the age of 18 living with them, 45.3% were married couples living together, 15.0% had a female householder with no husband present, and 36.1% were non-families. 32.8% of all households were made up of individuals, and 15.8% had someone living alone who was 65 years of age or older. The average household size was 2.25 and the average family size was 2.83.

In the city, the population was spread out, with 22.4% under the age of 18, 8.6% from 18 to 24, 24.3% from 25 to 44, 24.0% from 45 to 64, and 20.7% who were 65 years of age or older. The median age was 41 years. For every 100 females, there were 85.3 males. For every 100 females age 18 and over, there were 79.7 males.

The median income for a household in the city was $22,779, and the median income for a family was $29,771. Males had a median income of $26,311 versus $20,219 for females. The per capita income for the city was $15,101. About 20.7% of families and 23.9% of the population were below the poverty line, including 28.4% of those under age 18 and 16.5% of those age 65 or over.

Government
Savannah is governed by a mayor and a four-member city commission. It uses the city commission government system with the mayor being elected by the four commissioners. The city commission chooses among its members a vice mayor.

City Commission

Notable people
John Barnhill, football player, coach, and collegiate athletics administrator
Stubby Clapp, Major League baseball player and coach
Geron Davis, musician and composer
Hank DeBerry, Major League baseball catcher in the early 20th century
Jim Hardin, Major League pitcher from 1967 to 1973, World Series champion in 1970
Tom Hampton, Multi-instrumentalist, session musician, sideman, singer, and songwriter
Bolden Reush Harrison, naval officer and Medal of Honor recipient
Chad Harville, Major League pitcher 
Granville Hinton, politician
Myles Horton, educator and civil rights activist
Elizabeth Patterson, actress in films and on I Love Lucy
Randy Rinks, businessman and politician
Herman L. Wolfe, Sr., politician
Darryl Worley, country music performer

References

External links
City of Savannah official website

Cities in Tennessee
Cities in Hardin County, Tennessee
County seats in Tennessee
Tennessee populated places on the Tennessee River
1833 establishments in Tennessee